The Federal Reserve Bank of San Francisco, Los Angeles Branch, is the Southern California branch of the Federal Reserve Bank of San Francisco, located on West Olympic Boulevard and South Olive Street in southern Downtown Los Angeles. It is within the Twelfth Federal Reserve District.

Buildings
The original 1929 building was designed by John and Donald Parkinson in a Classical Moderne style with elements of zigzag moderne. It was listed on the National Register of Historic Places in 1984.

The adjacent  new branch structure with architectural design by Dan Dworsky, interiors by Gensler, construction by Swinerton & Walberg, and project Management by JLH Consulting, was completed in 1987 and dedicated in 1988. The project cost was approximately $50 million. It now houses all operations of the Los Angeles Branch. The original building has since been converted to residential lofts.

See also

Federal Reserve Bank of San Francisco — San Francisco building
List of Los Angeles Historic-Cultural Monuments in Downtown Los Angeles
National Register of Historic Places listings in Los Angeles, California
 List of Los Angeles federal buildings

References

External links
 

Los Angeles Branch
Bank buildings in California
Buildings and structures in Downtown Los Angeles
San Francisco, Los Angeles Branch
Office buildings in Los Angeles
Residential buildings in Los Angeles
Government buildings on the National Register of Historic Places in Los Angeles
Federal buildings in Los Angeles
Government buildings completed in 1929
1929 establishments in California
1920s architecture in the United States
John and Donald Parkinson buildings
Moderne architecture in California
Stripped Classical architecture in the United States